Peter Buchholz (2 October 1837 – 20 September 1892) was a German rabbi who served from 1875 to 1892 as Landesrabbiner of Friesland.

Biography
Buchholz received his rabbinical ordination on 27 June 1863, and became rabbi of Märkisch-Friedland later that year. There he remained until 1867, in which year he was called to the rabbinate of Stargard, Pomerania. On 2 April 1875 he became Landesrabbiner of Friesland, which position he filled with ability and distinction until his death. After 1882 he also served as Landesrabbiner of the district of Stade.

Buchholz was a good Talmudical scholar and well versed in modern philosophy. He was the author of a small work on the legal and moral relations of the family according to Jewish law, Die Familie in rechtlicher und moralischer Beziehung, nach mosaisch-talmudischer Lehre (Breslau, 1867); and some of his more important speeches and lectures were published by him or by his friends. He also wrote a number of articles on historical and other academic subjects in the Jewish periodicals of Germany, of which his "Historischer Ueberbliek über die mannigfachen Codifieationen des Halachastoffes" (Monatsschrift, 1864, pp. 201–241) and "R. Asarja Figa und seine Predigtsammlung 'Bina le-Ittim'" (Beilage zur Isr. Wochenschrift, 1872, nos. 4–9) are probably the most important.

Publications
Buchholz's publications include the following:

References
 

1837 births
1892 deaths
19th-century German rabbis
19th-century Prussian people
People from Emden
People from the Grand Duchy of Posen